The Roman Catholic Diocese of Koudougou is a diocese located in the city of Koudougou in the Ecclesiastical province of Ouagadougou in Burkina Faso.

History
 June 14, 1954: Established as Apostolic Vicariate of Koudougou from Apostolic Prefecture of Ouahigouya 
 September 14, 1955: Promoted as Diocese of Koudougou

Special churches
The cathedral is the Cathédrale Saint Augustin in Koudougou.

Bishops

Ordinaries, in reverse chronological order
 Bishops of Koudougou (Roman rite), below
 Bishop Joachim Ouédraogo (since November 4, 2011)
 Bishop Basile Tapsoba (July 2, 1984  – May 21, 2011)
 Bishop Anthyme Bayala (November 15, 1966  – April 3, 1984)
 Bishop Joseph-Marie-Eugène Bretault, M. Afr. (September 14, 1955  – November 19, 1965); see below
 Vicar Apostolic of Koudougou (Roman rite), below
 Bishop Joseph-Marie-Eugène Bretault, M. Afr. (June 27, 1954  – September 14, 1955); see above & below
 Prefect Apostolic of Koudougou (Roman rite), below
 Father Joseph-Marie-Eugène Bretault, M. Afr. (October 24, 1947  – June 27, 1954); see above

Auxiliary bishops
Basile Tapsoba (1981-1984), appointed Bishop here
Alexandre Yikyi Bazié (2019-)

Other priest of this diocese who became bishop
Justin Kientega, appointed Bishop of Ouahigouya in 2010

See also
Roman Catholicism in Burkina Faso

References

External links
 GCatholic.org

Koudougou
Christian organizations established in 1954
Roman Catholic dioceses and prelatures established in the 20th century
Koudougou, Roman Catholic Diocese of